Visa requirements for Ethiopian citizens are administrative entry restrictions by the authorities of other states placed on citizens of Ethiopia. As of 2 July 2019, Ethiopian citizens had visa-free or visa on arrival access to 41 countries and territories, ranking the Ethiopian passport 99th in terms of travel freedom (tied with passports from Congo (Dem. Rep.), South Sudan and Sri Lanka) according to the Henley Passport Index.

Visa requirements map

Visa requirements

Dependent, Disputed, or Restricted territories
Unrecognized or partially recognized countries

Dependent and autonomous territories

See also

Visa policy of Ethiopia
Ethiopian passport

References and Notes
References

Notes

Ethiopia
Foreign relations of Ethiopia